Neobanepa is a genus of moths of the family Crambidae. It contains only one species, Neobanepa peruviensis, which is found in Peru.

References

Natural History Museum Lepidoptera genus database

Crambinae
Crambidae genera
Taxa named by George Hampson